Dorysthenes buqueti, the sugarcane longhorn stemborer, is a species of longhorn beetles of the subfamily Prioninae.

Description
Color may be brownish, reddish brown or shiny brown, with an elongate body and long filiform antennae. Adults are nocturnal. They usually emerge between April–June following rainfall. This species is considered a pest of sugarcane and bamboo. Larvae dig in cane stubble causing severe damage, leading to the death of plants.

Distribution
This species can be found in India, Java, Laos, Malaysia, Thailand and Myanmar.

References
 Biolib
 Dossier on Dorysthenes buqueti as a Pest of Sugarcane

Prioninae
Beetles described in 1844